Shawn Murphy may refer to:

 Shawn Murphy (politician) (born 1951), Canadian politician
 Shawn Murphy (American football) (born 1982), American football player
 Shawn Murphy (sound engineer) (born 1948), American sound engineer

See also
 Shaun Murphy (disambiguation)
 Sean Murphy (disambiguation)